Jaime Torres (21 September 1938 – 24 December 2018) was an Argentine musician, son of Bolivian immigrants and a world-renowned interpreter of charango. He was disciple of Mauro Núñez, a Bolivian musician and luthier that built his first musical instruments.

Biography 
In 1974, the performer, along with his band, participated in the opening show of the World Cup soccer in Germany. A year later, Jaime Torres organized a local meeting of instrumentalists, repeating the same experience with children in 1980. In 1988 the musician composed the music for the film "La deuda interna", that was nominated for an Oscar.

In 1964 he participated in the recording of the Misa Criolla with Ariel Ramírez, and in 1965 he made his first European tour.

Discography
 1964: Virtuosismo en charango, Philips 82075
 1967: Aplausos para un charango, Philips 82162
 1968: Taquirari
 1969: Norte arriba
 1979: De antiguas razas
 1993: Chaypi, con Eduardo Lagos, Philips / Polygram 518 744-2
 2007: Charango, Sonkko, America
 2007: Electroplano
 2008: Altiplano

References

External links
 Jaime Torres' official website.
 La Nación, Buenos Aires 
 

1938 births
2018 deaths
Argentine musicians
Argentine people of Bolivian descent
People from San Miguel de Tucumán